László Bakos (14 October 1919 – 18 March 1998) was a Hungarian wrestler. He competed in the men's freestyle lightweight at the 1948 Summer Olympics.

References

External links
 

1919 births
1998 deaths
Hungarian male sport wrestlers
Olympic wrestlers of Hungary
Wrestlers at the 1948 Summer Olympics
People from Veszprém
Sportspeople from Veszprém County